Kristijan Lovrić (born 1 December 1995) is a Croatian professional footballer, currently playing as a winger for Croatian club NK Osijek.

International career
After three great seasons for Gorica in the Prva HNL, Croatia manager Zlatko Dalić activated a standby call-up for Lovrić due to the unavailability of Ante Rebić, for matches against Slovenia, Cyprus and Malta in the 2022 World Cup qualifiers. He made his debut on 30 March 2021 against Malta. On 17 May 2021, Lovrić was named in the preliminary 34-man squad for the UEFA Euro 2020, but did not make the final 26.

Personal life
He is married to Croatian footballer Monika Conjar.

Career statistics

Club

International

References

External links
 

1995 births
Living people
People from Ogulin
Association football wingers
Croatian footballers
Croatia international footballers
NK Bela Krajina players
NK Kustošija players
NK Lokomotiva Zagreb players
NK Lučko players
HNK Gorica players
NK Osijek players
Slovenian Second League players
Croatian Football League players
First Football League (Croatia) players
Second Football League (Croatia) players
Croatian expatriate footballers
Expatriate footballers in Slovenia
Croatian expatriate sportspeople in Slovenia